Memory technique may refer to:

In psychology and cognitive sciences
Art of memory
Memory improvement techniques
Mnemonics

In computer science
Memory management